Hawksworth is a village  west of the town of Guiseley in West Yorkshire, England.  It is located to the south of Menston and north of Baildon.

Etymology

The name of Hawksworth is first attested in a charter of 1030 in the phrase on Hafeces-weorðe, and then in the Domesday Book of 1086 in the form Hauochesuurde and variants thereof. The Old English word hafoces meant 'hawk's', but the word is thought in this place-name to have been a personal name; worð, meanwhile, means 'enclosure'. Thus the name once meant 'enclosure belonging to Hafoc'.

History

Hawksworth was historically a township in the large ancient parish of Otley in the West Riding of Yorkshire.  It became a separate civil parish in 1866.  In 1937 the civil parish was abolished and merged into the new Aireborough Urban District.  In 1974 Aireborough was itself abolished and absorbed into the City of Leeds Metropolitan District in the new county of West Yorkshire. It currently falls within the Guiseley and Rawdon Ward of the Leeds City Council.

Hawksworth Hall, a Grade II* listed building, is a large house, probably built in the 16th century.  Hawksworth Church of England Primary School has around 100 pupils.

Hawksworth is the model for the fictional village of "Windyridge" in the best-selling 1912 novel of that name by Willie Riley. The central character, London artist and photographer Grace Holden, finds the village by chance and decides to rent a cottage there for a year. Until the 1940s the village was often visited by readers looking for "Windyridge".

See also
Listed buildings in Guiseley and Rawdon

References 

Places in Leeds
Former civil parishes in West Yorkshire